The Order of the National Hero is the highest order of merit awarded by the government of Saint Kitts and Nevis. The order was founded in 1998. Recipients of this honour are styled as "The Right Excellent".

Recipients
1998: Robert Llewellyn Bradshaw, first Premier of Saint Kitts and Nevis.
2004: Paul Southwell, second Premier of Saint Kitts and Nevis.
2004: Sir Joseph Nathaniel France, politician and trade union leader. 
2013: Simeon Daniel, first Premier of Nevis.
2015: Sir Kennedy Simmonds, first Prime Minister of Saint Kitts and Nevis. He is the first living person to receive this honour.

See also
 National Heroes Day (Saint Kitts and Nevis)

References

Orders, decorations, and medals of Saint Kitts and Nevis
Awards established in 1998
1998 establishments in Saint Kitts and Nevis